HMS Bridport was a  built for the Royal Navy during the Second World War. She was built at the William Denny and Brothers shipyard in Dumbarton in 1940, and was sold in 1946 to the Royal Air Force Marine Branch, where she became HMRAFV Bridport and served until 1959, when she was broken up at Plymouth.

References 

  - www.uboat.net
  - www.harwichanddovercourt.co.uk
  - www.rafboats.co.uk

Bangor-class minesweepers of the Royal Navy
1940 ships
Ships built by Harland and Wolff